The South Asia Institute (SAI) is an interdisciplinary center of the Ruprecht-Karls University Heidelberg, Germany for research and teaching on South Asia. In German, it is known as the Südasien-Institut. The regional focus of the research and teaching at SAI are the countries Bangladesh, Bhutan, India, Maldives, Nepal, Pakistan and Sri Lanka. Due to their close linguistic, cultural, and historical ties with the South Asian subcontinent, adjacent regions such as Afghanistan and Tibet are also often included in the work done at the South Asia Institute.

Brief history and location 
SAI was founded at the Heidelberg University in 1962 by Werner Conze and Wilhelm Hahn. It was then located at the campus in Neuenheimer Feld, where it continued to be based for over half a century. 

In April 2019, SAI was shifted to the campus in the Bergheim locality of Heidelberg. There, this institute now forms one of the four constitutive institutes of Heidelberg University's Centre for Asian and Transcultural Studies (CATS) - the others being the Centre for East Asian Studies, the Department of Ethnology, and the Heidelberg Centre for Transcultural Studies. The library and collections of the former SAI were merged with those of the three other constituent institutes of CATS to form the CATS library, located in the middle of the new CATS campus. The current building housing SAI, like the other buildings of CATS, was built between 1869 and 1876, and served as a part of the Neues Akademisches Krankenhaus (New Academic Hospital) in Heidelberg. The location of CATS is right next to Bismarkplatz, one of the main commercial and transport hubs of Heidelberg.

SAI has branch offices in New Delhi (India), Islamabad (Pakistan), Kathmandu (Nepal), and Colombo (Sri Lanka).

Faculties and courses offered 

Currently, SAI has seven departments, each headed by a professor: Development Economics, Anthropology, Geography, History of South Asia, Cultural and Religious History of South Asia (Classical Indology), Modern South Asian Languages and Literatures (Modern Indology), and Political Science. Each department of SAI conducts research, at the professorial, postdoctoral, doctoral, and masters levels.  

SAI offers the following degrees fully devoted to South Asia:

 M.A. in Development, Environment, Societies, and History in South Asia
 M.A. in Cultural and Religious History of South Asia
 M.A. in Communication, Literature, and Media in Modern South Asian Languages (KLM)
 Master of Arts, Health and Society in South Asia (MAHASSA, an MA degree)
 B.A. in South Asian Studies

SAI also offers language courses in Bengali, Hindi, Urdu, and Tamil.

See also 
 Südasien-Institut (SAI on German Wikipedia)
 Centrum für Asienwissenschaften und Transkulturelle Studien (CATS on German Wikipedia)

References

External links

 sai.uni-heidelberg.de
 https://www.uni-heidelberg.de/en/study/all-subjects/south-asian-studies

Educational institutions established in 1962
Heidelberg University
Indology
Social science institutes
Earth science research institutes
Anthropological research institutes
Economic research institutes
Political science in Asia
Human geography
Research on poverty
Religion academics